is a leading case relevant for UK company law and the law on fraud and ex turpi causa non oritur actio. The House of Lords decided by a majority of three to two that where the director and sole shareholder of a closely held private company deceived the auditors with fraud carried out on all creditors, subsequently the creditors of the insolvent company would be barred from suing the auditors for negligence from the shoes of the company. The Lords reasoned that where the company was only identifiable with one person, the fraud of that person would be attributable to the company, and the "company" (or the creditors standing in its insolvent shoes) could not rely on its own illegal fraud when bringing a claim for negligence against any auditors. It was the last case to be argued before the House of Lords.

The decision was subject to much criticism, and was reviewed by the Supreme Court in Jetivia SA v Bilta (UK) Limited (in liquidation).

Facts
Stone & Rolls Ltd was wholly owned and directed by Mr Stojevic. Moore Stephens was the firm of chartered accountants hired to perform audits between 1996 and 1998. Mr Stojevic deceitfully siphoned assets of the company away and falsified accounts to show more profitable transactions than were real. In previous litigation, one of the main victims (a Czech bank, Komerční banka) had successfully sued both the company and Mr Stojevic. The company went into liquidation.

The company's creditors, acting in the name of the company, wished to sue the auditors for failing to detect the fraud, since both the company and Mr Stojevic were out of money. They claimed US$174m. The firm requested that the claim be struck out even before any question of their negligence was raised. They argued that even if they had been negligent it would be contrary to public policy to let the company sue them, because that would involve breach of the principle that a claimant cannot come to court and make a plea whilst relying on his own illegal behaviour (ex turpi causa non oritur actio).

Judgment

High Court
At the Commercial Court, Langley J held Mr Stojevic's actions and state of mind were to be attributed to the company. Because they were the same thing, it was artificial to describe the company as a "victim" of the fraud, and therefore to let the company sue the auditor. However, because detecting the fraud was the very thing the auditors were engaged to do, they would not be allowed to rely on the ex turpi causa defence to a negligence claim.

Court of Appeal
At the Court of Appeal of England and Wales, Mummery, Keene and Rimer LJJ reversed Langley J's decision in part, holding that:

 the illegality defence could not be removed simply because the very thing the auditors were meant to do was to detect fraud.
 the judge was otherwise correct in his conclusion on the issue of attribution.

Rimer LJ, in his concurring opinion, summarized why Moore Stephens did not owe a duty of care in this case:

House of Lords
In a split 3 to 2 ruling, the House of Lords dismissed the appeal and held by a majority that the auditors, Moore Stephens, could not be sued by the company's creditors. Although each judge gave slightly different reasons, Lord Phillips, Walker and Brown held the ex turpi causa defence barred the company's claim against the liquidator for negligence. Since Mr Stojevic was the exclusive owner and controller, it was logically necessary that his fraudulent intentions be attributed to the company. More specifically, Lord Phillips identified that the fraudulent act was done for the benefit of the company, and therefore the act of Mr Stojevic was attributed to be the act of Stone & Rolls through the organic process of attribution. The company was therefore deemed to be "aware" of the fraud and primarily liable for it. The auditors owed a duty to perform their audit diligently to the company (not to individual shareholders or creditors), and so if the company tried to bring a claim for breach of that duty it would necessarily be relying on its own illegality. Accordingly, the defence of ex turpi causa non oritur actio should be open to the auditors. Both Lord Walker and Lord Brown rejected that there should exist any principle that the ex turpi causa defence would be overridden when the duty involved was to protect against one's own criminality.

Lord Scott and Lord Mance dissented. Commentators argue that the majority misapplied the facts and overlooked the relevance of insolvency to the application of attribution.

Significance
In the introduction to his speech, Lord Mance noted the effect of what have come to be called "rogue companies":

The case was therefore seen to be a significant test of the extent of Caparo. The majority of the Lords held that Moore Stephens' duty of care extended only to the shareholders, while the minority suggested it ought to be extended to creditors as well. Because the majority considered that the fact S&R was essentially a "one man company" was significant in arriving at their result, it is suggested that a different result could have occurred if  innocent independent shareholders had also been involved.

It is also suggested that this case also emphasises the need for the courts to ensure that the activities of the rogue do not warp the general principles of the law of professional liability.

Commentators argue that Moore Stephens did not deliver a satisfactory result, because:

 the majority misapplied the facts by overlooking the relevance of insolvency to the application of attribution.
 the rules of attribution as laid down by Lord Hoffmann in Meridian Global Funds were misunderstood and misapplied.
 while the opinions of the minority risked creating a dangerous inroad into Salamon and Caparo, the opinions of the majority avoided that risk but reached the right result by tortuous reasoning.

However, the Law Commission in its 2010 report on the illegality defence, recommended that no legislative change should be made to it in relation to claims for breach of contract, tort or unjust enrichment.

Lord Sumption, who as barrister argued Moore Stephens' case before the Lords, since declared in a 2012 speech to the Chancery Bar Association that he believed the result was right, and stated the following principles that can be drawn from the jurisprudence surrounding the illegality defence:

It is not right to say that the rationale of the public policy varies according to the situation, and the statement of McLachlin J (as she then was) about it in Hall v. Hebert is right in principle. This was accepted by Lords Walker and Brown in Moore Stephens, and was subsequently accepted in 2011 by the High Court of Australia in Miller v Miller.
The Claimant’s illegal act must be the basis of his claim. In that regard, the minority view in Tinsley v Milligan is to be preferred.
There may be exceptional cases in which the principle of consistency positively requires that the illegality defence should fail, notwithstanding that the Claimant’s claim is founded on his own illegal act. That will happen if the purpose of the rule which the Claimant’s illegal act violated would be defeated by preventing him from suing on it.
The only way in which the complexity, capriciousness and injustice of the current English law can be addressed is by making the consequences of a finding that a claim is founded on the Claimant’s illegal act subject to a large element of judicial discretion.

The courts have subsequently held that:

 if an undertaking is penalised by the Office of Fair Trading for infringing competition law, the company cannot recover money for penalties from its directors or employees, as that is contrary to ex turpi causa non oritur actio.
 Moore Stephens is not applicable to cases in which the claim is based on a breach of duty the scope of which encompasses persons or interests other than the fraudsters in corporate form.

See also
 
 
 Multinational Gas and Petrochemical Co v Multinational Gas and Petrochemical Services Ltd [1983] Ch 258

Notes

References

External links
 
 Moore Stephens' website

United Kingdom company case law
House of Lords cases
2009 in case law
2009 in British law